Bondizeh (also Romanized as Bondīzeh, Bon Vīzeh, Bunarīzeh, and Būnrīzeh) is a village in Gudarzi Rural District, Oshtorinan District, Borujerd County, Lorestan Province, Iran. At the 2006 census, its population was 1,074, in 286 families.

References 

Towns and villages in Borujerd County